Trachylepis boulengeri, also known commonly as Boulenger's mabuya, is a species of skink, a lizard in the family Scincidae. The species is indigenous to southeastern Africa.

Etymology
The specific name, boulengeri, is in honor of Belgian-British herpetologist George Albert Boulenger.

Geographic range
T. boulengeri is found in Malawi, Mozambique, Tanzania, and Zimbabwe.

Habitat

Behavior
T. boulengeri is diurnal, and it is both arboreal and terrestrial.

Diet
T. boulengeri preys upon insects and spiders.

Reproduction
T. boulengeri is oviparous.

References

Further reading
Bauer AM (2003). "On the identity of Lacerta punctata Linnaeus 1758, the type species of the genus Euprepis Wagler 1830, and the generic assignment of Afro-Malagasy skinks". African Journal of Herpetology 52 (1): 1–7. (Trachylepis boulengeri, new combination).
Spawls, Stephen; Howell, Kim; Hinkel, Harald; Menegon, Michele (2018). Field Guide to East African Reptiles, Second Edition. London: Bloomsbury Natural History. 624 pp. . (Trachylepis boulengeri, p. 135).
Sternfeld R (1911). "Zur Reptilienfauna Deutsch-Ostafrikas ". Sitzungsberichte der Gesellschaft naturforschender Freunde zu Berlin 1911: 244–251. (Mabuia boulengeri, new species, pp. 248–249). (in German).

Trachylepis
Reptiles described in 1911
Taxa named by Richard Sternfeld